Dr. Knock (original title: Knock) is a 2017 French comedy film directed and adapted by Lorraine Lévy and starring Omar Sy. It is a remake of 1951's Dr. Knock directed by Guy Lefranc.

Premise
Dr. Knock is a thug and con man who goes to the small village of Saint-Maurice, where he plans to convince everyone that they are sick and only he can cure them. However, his past catches up with him.

Cast
 Omar Sy as Knock
 Alex Lutz as Lupus
 Ana Girardot as Adèle
 Sabine Azéma as La Cuq
 Pascal Elbé as Lansky
 Audrey Dana as Madame Mousquet
 Michel Vuillermoz as Monsieur Mousquet
 Hélène Vincent as The widow Pons
 Andréa Ferréol as Madame Rémy
 Rufus as The old Jules
 Nicolas Marié as Doctor Parpalaid
 Yves Pignot as The mayor

References

External links

2017 films
French comedy films
2017 comedy films
Films directed by Lorraine Lévy
Remakes of French films
2010s French-language films
2010s French films